Dolný Vék (also, Vék) is a village in the Nitra Region of Slovakia.

References

Villages in Slovakia